A quasi-corporation is an entity that exercises some of the functions of a corporation, but has not been granted separate legal personality by statute. For example, a public corporation with limited authority and powers such as a county or school district is a quasi-corporation.

Definition 

A quasi-corporation is an entity that is not incorporated or otherwise legally established, but which functions as if it were a corporation.

United States

Federal government 

When created by the federal government of the United States, these entities are commonly called quasi-public corporations. These now or in the past have included telegraph and telephone companies, oil and gas, water, and electrical power companies, and irrigation companies. Some examples of quasi-public corporations in the US are Sallie Mae, Fannie Mae/Freddie Mac, Amtrak (National Railroad Passenger Corporation), the Communications Satellite Corporation (“COMSAT”), and the US Postal Service.

State and local government 
In the United States, such entities established, supported, or controlled by a city, county, or township may be called quasi-municipal corporations.

References

Legal entities
Types of business entity
Corporate law